Claire Antonia Forlani is an English actress. She became known in the mid-1990s for her leading role in the film Mallrats, and in the Jean-Michel Basquiat 1996 biopic, Basquiat. In 1998, she achieved wide recognition for starring in the fantasy romance film Meet Joe Black. Other notable films include Mystery Men (1998), Boys and Girls (2000), Antitrust (2001), The Medallion (2003) and In the Name of the King (2007). Forlani also has appeared in numerous TV films and series, including a starring role on the historical-fantasy-drama series Camelot, and recurring roles on the CBS action series CSI: NY, NCIS: Los Angeles, and Hawaii Five-0. She played the role of Meredith Newman in the 2019 film Five Feet Apart.

Early life
Forlani was born in Twickenham, London, the daughter of Barbara, who is English, and Pier Luigi Forlani, a music manager from Ferrara, Italy. At age 11, Forlani entered the Arts Educational School in London, where she began to study acting. During her six years at the school, she also studied ballet, which led to performances on stage in The Nutcracker and Orpheus in the Underworld.

Career

Forlani's parents moved to San Francisco in 1993, in order to allow for wider casting opportunities in Hollywood films. Subsequently, she was cast in the television mini-series JFK: Reckless Youth and the film Police Academy: Mission to Moscow. In 1995, she played the supporting role of Brandi Svenning in Mallrats. In 1996, Forlani appeared in a supporting role as Sean Connery's daughter in the film The Rock. She continued to appear in both widely released and smaller-budget films, such as Basquiat, directed by Julian Schnabel. In 1998, she starred with Anthony Hopkins and Brad Pitt in Meet Joe Black. The following year she starred with Ben Stiller and Geoffrey Rush in Mystery Men. She then appeared opposite Ryan Phillippe and Tim Robbins in Antitrust, a thriller released in January 2001.

Forlani was the new face of L'Oréal in 2001. She has been ranked no. 51 (2000) and no. 89 (2001) in Stuff magazine's "100 Sexiest Women", no. 85 (2001) in FHM magazine's "100 Sexiest Women" and was in Loaded'''s "Hot 100 Babes".

In 2003, she co-starred with Jackie Chan in The Medallion, and in 2005 she appeared in Green Street Hooligans with Charlie Hunnam and Elijah Wood. In 2007's Hallam Foe she starred with Jamie Bell and Ciarán Hinds. In Autumn 2006, Forlani joined the cast of CSI: NY in a recurring role as a medical examiner, Dr. Peyton Driscoll. In February 2007, Forlani portrayed Tori Bodeen in the film version of Nora Roberts's best-selling book Carolina Moon. In 2008, she starred opposite Daniel Craig in Flashbacks of a Fool. In 2011, she played Queen Igraine in Camelot.

In 2010, Forlani made an appearance on NCIS: Los Angeles as Agent Lauren Hunter, replacing Henrietta Lange (Linda Hunt) temporarily as the operations director at NCIS for the end of season 2. She later appeared in season 3's finale.

Forlani has appeared in a series of television commercials for Dewar's.

In 2015, she was one of the narrators of the documentary Unity.

In 2016, the second episode of season seven of Hawaii Five-0 introduced Alicia Brown, a retired criminal profiler portrayed by Forlani. In a recurring role, Brown helped the Five-0'' team find a serial killer.

Personal life
On 8 June 2007 Forlani married Scottish actor Dougray Scott in Italy. Their son, Milo Thomas Scott, was born on 27 December 2014.

In 2017, Forlani revealed that she "escaped" Harvey Weinstein five times, including twice in a hotel, and that she had a "disgusting" experience with the producer.

Filmography

Film

Television

References

External links

Actresses from London
English people of Italian descent
People of Emilian descent
Living people
People educated at the Arts Educational Schools
Actors from Twickenham
English film actresses
English television actresses
English stage actresses
Year of birth missing (living people)